Anthony I or Antony I may refer to:

 Anthony I of Constantinople, Archbishop of Constantinople and Ecumenical Patriarch from 821 to 837
 Anthony I, Count of Ligny (1450–1519)
 Anthony I, Serbian Patriarch, Archbishop of Peć and Serbian Patriarch from 1571 to 1574
 Anthony I of Portugal (1531–1595), King of Portugal in 1580
 Anthony I, Eritrean Patriarch (born 1929), Archbishop of Asmara and Eritrean Patriarch from 2004 to 2007
 Anthony I, Count of Oldenburg (1505–1573)

See also
 Patriarch Anthony (disambiguation)